Esanland (Esan: Otọesan), is a cultural region located in Edo State, Nigeria. It is composed of five Local Government Areas in Edo State. Esanland lies west of the banks of the Niger River. It is bordered by Kogi State, Delta State, Edo South Senatorial District, and Edo North Senatorial District. Esanland covers about 2,800 square kilometers and is home to over half a million people. The Esan people and culture of Esanland are generally homogenous.

Esanland has been inhabited since the late Iron Age, by hunter-gatherers from the Nok culture. The hunter gatherers formed a society in northern Esanland until the 12th century. In the 15th century, indigenes from the Great Benin Empire moved to Esanland and renewed Edo-Esan cultural bonds as the Benin were the Royal blood and Emperor controlling the Southern Hemisphere. Esan nations often worked either in tandem or subordination towards the Benin Empire, sending soldiers to the Benin army and treating their rulers as dukes to the Oba of Benin.

Trade  with the Portuguese brought modern innovations such as Dane guns and spoons, and new crops.

Independent rule in Esanland continued into the 1800s, until the British claimed the entire region for the Royal Niger Company as part of the colony Nigeria. Local opposition to the conquest was vocal, and  such as King Ogbidi Okojie of Uromi banded together their soldiers in an unsuccessful attempt to fight British rule. After the British takeover, independence movements sprung up. Leaders in Esanland such as Anthony Enahoro successfully campaigned for independence, which was granted to the whole of Nigeria. Since independence, Esanland has suffered from poor infrastructure and an attempted takeover in the Nigerian Civil War by Biafra.

Etymology
Esanland originates from the term "E san fia", meaning they have fled in the Edo language (Esan), referring to the flight of refugees from the Benin Empire to the surrounding forest that makes up the original Esans.

History
According to archaeological and linguistic evidence, humans have resided in the savannah-forest ecotone in Esanland for at least 3000 years. These people were likely associated with the Nok people and came from the savannahs in the north to the southern forests. To this day, northern Esan dialects have more in common with Northern Edo languages such as Etsako and Owan than southern Esan dialects do, which happen to be closely related with Edo. These "proto-Edoid" peoples grew yam, oil palm and vegetables, but also hunted and gathered.

Starting from 500 AD to 750 AD, these hunter-gatherers started to colonize the savannah-forest ecosystem of Esanland and the forest ecosystem of the Benin Empire. They created a pre-Esan, pre-Edo society that built advanced structures such as moats and walls around family properties. These enclosures were, at maximum, three to five kilometers in diameter, and demarcated residential and agricultural property. Those properties enlarged to become villages, and by 800 AD, these village coalesced to form kingdoms with hierarchies. Settlements were close to permanent springs on the northern plateau, but never next to intermittent springs.

Esanland's culture, language and growth were majorly influenced by the mass exoduses to Esan territory from all adjacent polities Communities on Esanland's southern and eastern fringes (Ewohimi, Ewatto, Ekpon, Amahor) were heavily populated by Igbos and Igalas (into Uroh); from the north came the Emai into Ukhun, Idoa, and Amahor and the Etsako into Irrua; and from the south came the Itsekiri (into Ekpon) and Urhobo (into Ujiogba).

The biggest influence on Esanland came from the Benin Empire. In 1460, Oba Ewuare passed laws of mourning that prohibited sexual intercourse, bathing, drumming, dancing, and cooking. These laws proved too restrictive for many citizens, and these citizens fled the kingdom to Esanland. This exodus shaped Esanland's modern cultural identity and gave rise to the term "Esan," or "refugee." Oral tradition has heavily supported this theory. Prominent Esan  and Edo historians have collected stories about this migration.

Pre-colonization 

Esan kingdoms had a varying degree of autonomy, but were ultimately controlled by the Benin Empire. Yet, several wars between Esan kingdoms and Benin were recorded. This was due to the Oba, at ascension on the throne, sending white chalk to the Esans as a term of friendship. If the chalk was rejected, then the Oba would try to invade Esanland. The varying political stabilities of Benin and the Esan kingdoms also led to warfare. Such warfare was so common that there is no recorded history of peace between all of the Esan kingdoms and Benin.

Esanland was extensively involved in world trade. Ekhen procured cloth, ivory, peppers and resources.

During the 16th century, the Uzea War occurred. This war was between the Uromi Kingdom and the Benin Kingdom.  The war lasted from 1502 to 1503, and resulted from a refusal of friendship from Oba Ozolua of Benin by Onojie Agba of Uromi. The war ended at the town of Uzea, when both leaders were killed. However, in peaceful times Esan kingdoms would loan soldiers to the Benin Kingdom, such as during the Idah War of 1515-1516, and the sacking of Akure in 1823.

During the nineteenth century, northern Esanland was continually attacked and sacked by the Muslim Nupe people in the hunt for slaves and converts to Islam, having previously taken over the Kukuruku peoples’ lands. Many Esan kingdoms from the south helped in the battle to fend off the Nupes. The battles came into the Esans’ favor; several Nupe and Etsako warriors were brought into Esan cities where their posterity reside today. The nineteenth century brought increasing influence of Europe on Esanland, as the English demanded palm-products.

Esan warfare and colonization  

In 1897, the British sacked the Benin Empire, effectively leaving the Esans free from British rule. In 1899, the British led an invasion into the Esan kingdoms that lasted for seven years. Esanland chose to keep fighting the British even if its neighbors fell. Fallen Benin chiefs like Ologbosere and Ebohon were still resistant to British rule inadvertently guarded Esan soil from the west, by establishing military camps and blocking roads. This lasted from 1897 to April 22. 1899, where Ologbosere surrendered at the border village of Okemue.

The first kingdom to be attacked by the British was the Kingdom of Ekpon. Ekpon launched a fierce resistance against the British invasion on April 22, which nearly destroyed the kingdom. After the near genocide of Esans at Ekpon, the kingdom of Ekpon led an ambush of the British camp at Okueme, on April 29. This led British forces to retreat, consolidate their power, and kill Ologbosere in May. Subsequent attempts by the British failed as well: conquests into Irrua, for example, led to an adoption of a guerrilla warfare strategy followed by a retreat; this method was so successful that other Esan kingdoms adopted it and the British did not invade Esanland until 1901.

On March 16, 1901, the Kingdom of Uromi, headed by the old, yet intelligent Onojie Okolo, was attacked by the British. The Uromi resistance, led by Prince Okojie, was swift and employed guerrilla warfare. After a short time, British forces overtook the village Amedeokhian, where Okolo was stationed, and murdered him. This angered Prince Okojie so much that he killed the Captain of the British troops before reinforcements were brought in. The British then realized that Uromi was nigh impenetrable without native help, and contact local sympathizers such as Onokpogua, the Ezomo of Uromi. This succeeded in napping Prince Okojie out of the forest and deported to the British offices at Calabar.

This process was duplicated in most of the kingdoms that fought with Britain: guerilla warfare was excessively used by the Esans, resulting in prolonged battle time in spite of inferior weapons, and reinforcements from Benin City for the British. Even when villages were conquered, internal resistance was fierce: continued guerilla warfare in Uromi forced the British to release Prince Okojie. However, excessive cruelty on Britain's part razed many villages and displaced many people. Finally, in 1906, Esanland submitted to British rule, and the thirty-four kingdoms became the Ishan Division..

Politics and government

Geography
It is dominated by the Ishan-Asaba Plateau in Midwestern Nigeria. This plateau is the source of many streams in the region.

Culture

References

Politics of Edo State
Cultural regions
Senatorial districts in Nigeria
Regions of West Africa
Separatism in Nigeria
Esan people